Nahil Carroll (born 9 September 1983) is a football defender who currently plays in Panama for the LPF team, Atlético Nacional.

Club career
Carroll joined Sporting San Miguelito from Árabe Unido in May 2011. In December 2012, he moved from Plaza Amador to newly promoted Río Abajo and he made the same switch a year later. After a season at Tauro, he joined Alianza in December 2014.

In June 2015 he clinched promotion to the LPF after his team Atlético Nacional won the Panamanian Second Division championship decider against SUNTRACS.

International career
He made his debut for Panama in May 2014 friendly match against Serbia and has, as of 1 June 2015, earned a total of 3 caps, scoring no goals.

Honors

Club
Liga Panameña de Fútbol (1): 2008 (C)
'''Liga Panameña de Fútbol: Apertura 2009 II

References

External links
 

1983 births
Living people
Sportspeople from Panama City
Association football defenders
Panamanian footballers
Panama international footballers
Sporting San Miguelito players
C.D. Árabe Unido players
C.D. Plaza Amador players
Tauro F.C. players
Alianza Panama players